"From a Jack to a King" is a country music song. Originally a crossover hit for  artist Ned Miller, who also wrote "Dark Moon", "A Falling Star", and many other country songs. It has been covered extensively by country music artists.

Ned Miller version
The original version was recorded by Ned Miller. First released in 1957 by both Fabor Records (for regional audiences) and Dot Records (for national distribution), Miller's version was unsuccessful until he persuaded his label to re-release it five years later. Upon re-release, the song became a crossover hit, charting in the Top 10 on the Billboard U.S. country (#2), pop (#6), and adult contemporary (#3) charts. In addition, Miller's version reached #1 on the Irish Singles Chart, while peaking at #2 on the UK Singles Chart. Furthermore, it was the sixth-most-played single of 1963 in the United Kingdom. Miller's chart success was limited after the song, however, and by the 1970s he stopped recording entirely.

The song was also recorded in 1962 by Jim Reeves on the occasion of his tour to South Africa in August and charted there that year.

Chart positions

Ricky Van Shelton version

In December 1988, American country music artist Ricky Van Shelton released his own version of "From a Jack to a King". Shelton's version became his fifth consecutive Number One on the Billboard Hot Country Singles charts.

Chart positions

Year-end charts

Other versions
Bill Anderson covered the song on his 1963 album Still, released by Decca Records.

Elvis Presley recorded it in 1969 and the song was included on this Back in Memphis album released in 1970. Jerry Lee Lewis also released a version of the song. Mud recorded the song in 1982.

South African singer Ray Dylan covered the song on his album Goeie Ou Country - Op Aanvraag.

Oesch's die Dritten recorded it for their Unser Regenbogen CD, released March 16, 2012. Sung by Melanie Oesch, it was the Swiss family band's first recording of a song in English.

Dutch country singer Ben Steneker released his single of "From a Jack to a King" in 1963.

References

1962 singles
1988 singles
Ned Miller songs
Bill Anderson (singer) songs
Elvis Presley songs
Jerry Lee Lewis songs
Ricky Van Shelton songs
Steve Buckingham
Irish Singles Chart number-one singles
Number-one singles in Norway
Columbia Records singles
1957 songs
Songs written by Ned Miller